Sean McNulty (born 10 July 1995) is a professional rugby union player who currently plays as a hooker for the LA Giltinis of Major League Rugby (MLR).

He previously played as a hooker for the MLR's New England Free Jacks and Rugby United New York (RUNY) on loan for the 2019 Major League Rugby season. McNulty came through the Munster Rugby academy system before joining the Leinster Rugby Academy and playing for Leinster A in the British & Irish Cup.

References

1995 births
Living people
Alumni of University College Dublin
Alumni of the University of Hertfordshire
English expatriate rugby union players
English expatriate sportspeople in the United States
Expatriate rugby union players in the United States
Leinster Rugby players
New England Free Jacks players
Rugby New York players
Rugby union hookers
Rugby union players from London
LA Giltinis players
Irish rugby union players
Seattle Seawolves players
San Diego Legion players